Antrafenine (Stakane) is a phenylpiperazine derivative drug invented in 1979. It acts as an analgesic and anti-inflammatory drug with similar efficacy to naproxen, but is not widely used as it has largely been replaced by newer drugs.

Synthesis

Method E: The reaction between 2-[4-[3-(trifluoromethyl)phenyl]-1-piperazinyl]ethanol [40004-29-3] (1) and Isatoic anhydride [118-48-9] (2) goes on to give 4-(3-(Trifluoromethyl)phenyl)piperazine-1-ethyl 2-aminobenzoate [51941-08-3] (3).

Method G: Alkylation with 4-chloro-7-(trifluoromethyl)quinoline [346-55-4] (4) completed the synthesis of antrafenine (5).

See also 
 Phenylpiperazine
Trifluoromethylphenylpiperazine

References 

meta-Trifluoromethylphenylpiperazines
Anthranilates
Quinolines